The most popular sport in Mexico currently is association football followed by boxing. However, there are regional variations: for example, baseball is the most popular sport in the northwest and the southeast of the country. Basketball, American football and bull riding (called "Jaripeo") are also popular. The tradition of bullfighting remains strong in Mexico.

History of sport in Mexico

Mesoamerican ball game 

The Pre-Columbian people of Mesoamerica have played the Mesoamerican ball game for over 3,000 years. Archaeologists found the oldest ballcourt yet discovered – dated to approximately 1400 BC – at Paso de la Amada in Mexico. The exact rules of the traditional ballgame remain unknown. Researchers believe that the sport probably resembled racquetball or volleyball, where the object is to keep the ball in play. The winner was sacrificed.

In their Post-Classical Era (1000–1697 CE), the Maya began placing vertical stone rings on each side of the court, with the object of passing the ball through one. Several of these were placed quite high, as at Chichen Itza, where they stand 6 meters from the ground. Players would strike the ball with their hips or forearms, or employed rackets, bats, or hand-stones.

The ball was made of  rubber and weighed up to 4 kg or more, with sizes that differed greatly over time or according to the version played. Games took place between two individuals and between two teams of players. The ballgame played out within a large masonry structure which contained a long narrow playing alley flanked by walls with both horizontal and sloping (or, more rarely, vertical) surfaces. The walls were often plastered and brightly painted.
A version of the game called Ulama is still played in the Mexican state of Sinaloa.

Pelota purépecha has the Purépecha language, and is an Indigenous Mexican sport. A common variant, distinguished as pasárutakua in Purépecha, uses a ball which has been set on fire and can be played at night. It has a league, several practicing communities and about 800 players across Mexico as of 2010. It is one of 150 pre-Hispanic Mexican games at risk of dying out along with Ulama.

Bullfighting 

Typically, a bullfight in Mexico includes a variety of rodeo events known as charreadas, and traditional folkloric dances. Thousands of bullfighting events occur in Mexico. In certain areas of the country, bullfighting generates a large amount of revenue from the local population, as well as visiting tourists.

As evidence of the popularity of the sport, the largest bullring in the world is the Plaza Mexico, located in Mexico City. The Plaza México has been host to many of the world's best and most famous bullfighters. The anniversary of the 1946 opening of Plaza Mexico is celebrated annually with a special bullfight called the "Corrida de Aniversario".

Charrería 

Charrería is the national sport of Mexico, it dates back to the 16th century and consists of a series of Mexico-developed equestrian events. The most notable event is the charreada, a style of rodeo developed in Mexico in the interest of maintaining the traditions of the charro. A charro is a term referring to a traditional horseman or a cowboy of Mexico, originating in the state of Jalisco. The national horse of Mexico, used in Charreria, is the Azteca.

The Federación Mexicana de Charrería (Mexican Federation of Charreria) organizes charrería events.

Cockfight 
Cockfighting is not banned in Mexico, and practiced in the Mexican states of Michoacán, Aguascalientes, Jalisco, Sinaloa, and Veracruz, mostly during regional fairs and other celebrations. Cockfights are performed in palenques (pits). Cockfighting remains legal in the municipality of Ixmiquilpan and throughout Mexico.

International Games Competitions

Olympic Games 

Mexico City hosted the 1968 Summer Olympics, the first time that the event was held in Latin America. Since then, the only edition of the Olympic Games held in the region was in 2016, in Rio de Janeiro, Brazil.

Mexico first participated at the Olympic Games in 1900 and has sent athletes to compete in every Summer Olympic Games since 1924. Mexico has also participated in several Winter Olympic Games since 1928. Mexico has performed best in athletics, boxing, equestrian, diving, and Swimming events, and more recently taekwondo and football.

Enriqueta Basilio made history by being the first woman to light the Olympic Cauldron at 19th Summer Olympics in Mexico City on 12 October 1968.

In diving, Mexico is the best Latin American representative with a long tradition of diving founded by Joaquín Capilla, a Mexican diver who won the largest number of Olympic medals among Mexican athletes. Many others who have excelled in World Championships and Olympics are Carlos Girón, Fernando Platas and Paola Espinosa who is the first Latina woman to become world champion. Soraya Jiménez became the first ever female athlete from Mexico to win an Olympic gold medal in 2000.

At the 2012 Summer Olympics, Mexico finished in thirty-ninth place; the Mexico team brought home seven medals, including their first gold medal won in football, and the rest of the medals in archery, diving, and taekwondo.

Donovan Carrillo is the first Mexican figure skater to compete at the Olympics in 30 years in 2022, and after scoring a personal best in the short program became the first ever Mexican skater to advance to the free skate.

Pan American Games 

The Pan American Games competition is held among athletes from nations of the Americas, every four years in the year before the Summer Olympic Games. Mexico ranks sixth in the top ten nations all time at the Pan American Games (minus medals won at the Winter Pan American Games). Mexico and Canada have hosted three Pan American Games each, more than any other nation. Among cities, only Winnipeg and Mexico City have played host to the Pan American Games more than once, each holding that honor twice.

Similar to the Olympic flame, the Pan American Games flame is lit well before the Games are to commence. The flame was lit for the first games in Olympia, Greece. For subsequent games, the torch has been lit by Aztec people in ancient temples, first in the Cerro de la Estrella and later at the Pyramid of the Sun at the Teotihuacan Pyramids. The only exception was for the São Paulo games in 1963, when the torch was lit in Brasília by the indigenous Guaraní people. An Aztec then lights the torch of the first relay bearer, thus initiating the Pan American Games torch relay that will carry the flame to the host city's main stadium, where it plays an important role in the opening ceremony. The 2011 Pan American Games were the third Pan American Games hosted by Mexico (the first country to do so) and the first held in the state of Jalisco in the city of Guadalajara.

Central American and Caribbean Games 

The Central American and Caribbean Games is a multi-sport regional championship event, held quadrennially (once every four years), typically in the middle (even) year between Summer Olympics. The Games are for countries in Central America, the Caribbean, Mexico, and the South American Caribbean countries of Colombia, Guyana, Suriname, and Venezuela. They are designed to provide a step between sub-CACG-region Games held the first year following a Summer Olympics (e.g. Central American Games) and the Continental Championships, the Pan American Games, held the year before the Summer Olympics. The CACGs are the oldest continuing regional games in the world. As of 2014, Mexico has hosted the CACG games four times, three in Mexico City and one in Veracruz. Mexico is also one of the three countries present at the first games and the first organizer of the Games. Mexico is the only country that has attended all editions, without a single absence and has the most medals and second most gold medals as of 2019.

Team sports

Association football 

Mexico's most popular team sport is association football. Football is widely followed and practiced all over the country and it is considered the most popular sport in most states. It is believed that football was introduced in Mexico by English Cornish miners at the end of the 19th century. By 1902 a five-team league emerged with a strong English influence. Football became a professional sport in 1943. The main football clubs are América, Guadalajara, Cruz Azul and UNAM, known collectively as the Big Four.

Mexico has hosted two World Cup tournaments (1970 and 1986). Many of the stadiums in use in the league have a World Cup history. Sites such as Estadio Jalisco in Guadalajara, and Estadio Azteca in Mexico City are renowned for their national and international history. The legendary Estadio Azteca, for example, is one of the only two stadiums in the world to have hosted two men's World Cup finals (the other being the Maracana) and is one of the highest capacity stadiums in the world. Mexican's biggest stadiums are Estadio Azteca, Estadio Jalisco, Estadio BBVA Bancomer, Estadio Olímpico Universitario and Estadio Cuauhtémoc.

The 1986 FIFA World Cup in Mexico was broadcast to a global audience, and the wave or the Mexican wave was popularized worldwide after featuring during the tournament.

Men's National team

The Mexico national football team (Spanish: Selección de fútbol de México) represents Mexico in association football and is governed by the Mexican Football Federation (FMF, from the native name of Federación Mexicana de Fútbol Asociación), the governing body for football in Mexico. Mexico's home stadium is the Estadio Azteca and their head coach is Gerardo Martino. The team is currently ranked 21st in the World Football Elo Ratings.

Mexico has qualified for fifteen FIFA World Cup tournaments and is among six countries to have qualified consecutively since 1994. Mexico, Brazil and Germany, are the only nations to make it out of the group stage in the six World Cup tournaments since. Mexico played France at the first World Cup on July 13, 1930. Mexico's best progression was reaching the quarter-finals in the 1970 and 1986 World Cups, both of which were staged on Mexican soil, and will host once again in 2026 sharing with Canada and United States.

The Mexico national football team won the 1999 FIFA Confederations Cup and the gold medal in London 2012, finished twice as runners-up at the Copa América, won the 2005 FIFA U-17 World Championship, and have reached the quarter finals twice at the World Cup. Recently, some players from Mexico have moved on to European clubs, including Rafael Márquez, Carlos Salcido, Ricardo Osorio, Pável Pardo, Andrés Guardado, Guillermo Franco, Carlos Vela, Giovani dos Santos, Omar Bravo, Aaron Galindo, Héctor Moreno, Francisco Javier Rodríguez and others.

Mexico is historically the most successful national team in the CONCACAF region, holding nine CONCACAF championships, including six CONCACAF Gold Cups, one North American Nations Cup and three NAFC Championships. Mexico is the only team from CONCACAF to have won an official FIFA competition, the 1999 FIFA Confederations Cup. Although Mexico is under the jurisdiction of CONCACAF, the national football team has been regularly invited to compete in the Copa América since 1993 finishing as runner-up twice and obtaining the third place medal on three occasions.

Men's Professional leagues

The first Mexican club, C.F. Pachuca, survives. Since 1996, the country has played two split seasons instead of a traditional long season. There are two separate playoff and league divisions. This system is common throughout Latin America. After many years of calling the regular seasons as "Verano" (Summer) and "Invierno" (Winter); the top-level Liga MX, formerly the Primera División, has changed the names of the competition, and has opted for a traditional name of "Apertura" (opening) and "Clausura" (closing) events. The Apertura division begins in the middle of Mexico's summer and ends before the official start of winter. The Clausura division begins during the New Year, and concludes in the spring season.

Mexican football is divided into four divisions, beginning with Liga MX and followed by Ascenso MX, the Liga Premier, and Tercera División. The bottom two leagues translate literally as "Second Division" and "Third Division"; their names reflect their former positions in the league hierarchy before the Segunda División was split into two leagues, with the league now known as Ascenso MX becoming the new second level.

The teams are promoted and relegated by the FMF based on percentage calculations. Relegation is a common practice in Mexican football. There is a club exchange of each tier with the adjacent tiers so that a division's least successful team is relegated (transferred) to the next lower tier and the most successful club of the lower tier is promoted to the tier above. By the placement of each, the top tier cannot promote and the bottom tier cannot relegate.

The relegation system does not punish clubs for producing a single poor season. Mexican clubs are assessed on their previous five campaigns. Points are accumulated for five seasons, and are divided by the number of matches played. The club with the lowest percentage in the Apertura is relegated to a lower division. Each team must earn their promotions.

Since 1943, Mexico's five most successful clubs in Mexican football league system matches have been América  (13 championships), Chivas (12), Toluca (10), Cruz Azul (8) and Pumas (7). America is the historical arch-nemesis of Chivas, so a match between the two is the Clásico Nacional derby that the entire country awaits. Another noted derby in Mexico is the Clásico Regiomontano between crosstown rival teams Monterrey and Tigres. Whereas the Clásico Nacional involves two teams from cities in different states the Clásico Regiomontano game involves two neighboring cities. Chivas are renowned for using only Mexican players in their squad. Consequently, they have long fed players to the Mexico national football team.

Men players

Hugo Sánchez widely regarded as the greatest Mexican footballer of all time, was named best CONCACAF player of the 20th century by IFFHS. No other Mexican footballer has scored as many goals in Europe as Hugo Sánchez. He is the fourth highest scorer in the history of La Liga, the third-highest scoring foreign player after Lionel Messi and Cristiano Ronaldo. Carlos Vela described as a versatile player who can play as a forward, winger, and attacking midfielder, Vela is known for being a creative player and prolific scorer. Rafael Márquez the first Mexican to win the UEFA Champions League is considered by many the best defender in the country's football history. Márquez is Mexico's record World Cup player and one of only three players with appearances in five tournaments. Cuauhtémoc Blanco is the only Mexican football player to be presented with an award (The Silver Ball and Silver Shoe) in a major international FIFA competition (1999 FIFA Confederations Cup). He shares the record as the highest scorer of the tournament with Ronaldinho (nine goals in two editions). He has been awarded the MVP of the México Primera División League five times. Jorge Campos with the national team, appeared in three World Cups, two Confederation Cups, two Gold Cups and three Copas América. Horacio Casarín was sought out by defenders and fouled him mercilessly during a 1939 game between Casarin's Necaxa, and Asturias F.C., Necaxa fans were so angry that they burnt the Parque Asturias stadium. Horacio retired as the all-time Mexican scorer, with 256 goals to his count. Antonio Carbajal was the first player to appear in five World Cups and the only Mexican player that has received the FIFA Order of Merit. Claudio Suárez is the most capped player in the history of Mexico national team with 178 caps. As of 2006, it was estimated that Mexico has over 324,000 registered players and 8,155,000 unregistered players.

Women's football in Mexico

The Mexico women's national football team boasts one silver (1971) and one bronze (1970) in the Women's World Cup, though these accomplishments are not officially recognized, as they took place prior to FIFA's recognition of the women's game.

Mexico stopped allocating players to the NWSL management of the United States, having established its own women's league the Liga MX Femenil in 2017, and the numbers of allocated players and international players on each team vary each year due to trades. Maribel Domínguez was a noted captain and leading scorer of the Mexico women's national football team. She is known internationally as "Marigol" for her record of 46 goals scored in 49 matches for the Mexico women's national team.

Variants of association football 
Beach football is a variant of the sport of association football which was invented in Brazil. It is played on beaches, and emphasizes skill, agility and goal scoring. The FIFA Beach Football World Cup has been held annually since 2005. Mexico finished as runners up to Brazil in its first appearance at the 2007 Beach Football World Cup.

Recently indoor association football has become a popular sport in Mexico, being included as part of the Universiada (University National Games) and the "CONADEIP" (Private School Tournament), which match University school teams from all over Mexico.  In Mexico, "indoor" football fields are commonly built outdoors, and the sport is known as "fútbol rápido" (fast football).

The Mexican team Monterrey La Raza joined the Major Indoor football League in 2007 and finished the season in second place during its inaugural year. A previous version of Monterrey La Raza (1992–2001) won three championships in the now defunct organizations Continental Indoor Football League and World Indoor Football League.

Baseball 

Baseball has been practiced throughout all Mexico across time. It has been traditionally known as the most popular sport in some regions of Mexico, mainly in Sonora and Sinaloa, and arguably in Campeche, Yucatán, Durango, Chihuahua, Nayarit and Tabasco, where it rivals football in popularity. Other states where baseball has had a strong traditional legacy include Baja California, Oaxaca, Coahuila, Veracruz, Puebla, Nuevo León, Tamaulipas, Quintana Roo and Mexico City. Despite historically lagging third in popularity behind football and boxing, Mexico has had relative success in the sport, probably just behind boxing and comparable to the success obtained in football.

Although there is some dispute about exactly when and where baseball started in Mexico, baseball has a long and colorful history in Mexico, particularly in the north, with historians placing its origin there as early as the 1840s. Today, baseball flourishes in Mexico, where it is played professionally in both summer and winter.

Over 100 Mexicans have played in the major leagues in the United States, including Cy Young Award winner Fernando Valenzuela, top 300 home run hitter Vinny Castilla, Gold Glove Award winner Aurelio Rodríguez, and AL batting champion Bobby Ávila. The first Mexican to play in Major League Baseball in the United States was Mel Almada, who participated with the Boston Red Sox in 1933.

The Mexican Baseball League ("Liga Mexicana de Béisbol" or "LMB") was founded in 1925, establishing six teams, and playing all their matches in Mexico City. In the 1930s and 1940s, African-Americans from the United States – who were still barred from Major League Baseball until Jackie Robinson broke the color barrier in 1947 – played alongside Mexicans and Cubans in the Mexican League. In 1937, legendary Negro leagues' stars Satchel Paige and "Cool Papa Bell" left the Pittsburgh Crawfords to play in Latin America. After playing a year in Santo Domingo, Dominican Republic, Paige and Bell joined the Mexican League.

In the 1940s, multi-millionaire Jorge Pasquel attempted to turn the Mexican League into a first-rate rival to the major leagues in the United States. In 1946, Pasquel traveled north of the border to pursue the top players in the Negro and major leagues. Pasquel signed up close to twenty major leaguers, including such well known names as Mickey Owen and Sal Maglie, and a number of Negro league players. Ultimately, Pasquel's dream faded, as financial realities led to decreased salaries and his high-priced foreign stars returned home.

Currently, 16 teams divided into North and South Divisions play in the Mexican Baseball League in a summer season, which ends in a 7-game championship series between the winners of the two divisions. Since 1967, the league has been sanctioned as an AAA minor league, though no team has an affiliation with any team in the United States.

In the winter, 10 teams play in the Mexican Pacific League ("Liga Mexicana del Pacífico" or "LMP"), whose winner advances to the Caribbean Series against other Latin American champions. Although the Mexican League has a longer history, the Mexican Pacific League is the premier baseball league in Mexico today. It is played during the Major League Baseball (MLB) off-season, so many MLB players also compete in the LMP.

The Mexican Professional Baseball Hall of Fame has inducted 167 players, consisting of 138 Mexicans, 16 Cubans, 12 from the United States, and one Puerto Rican. Distinguished players include MLB stars Roy Campanella and Monte Irvin, who played in the Mexican League in the 1940s. Nicknamed "El Bambino Mexicano", or the Mexican Babe Ruth, Héctor Espino was inducted in the Mexican Hall of Fame in 1988, after playing with San Luis Potosí, and Tampico from 1962 to 1984. His 453 home runs remained the record until Nelson Barrera surpassed him in 2001. Espino still holds the all-time records in many offensive categories.

The Mexico national baseball team represents Mexico in international tournaments, most notably the World Baseball Classic. In the Bronze Medal Game of the Premier12 tournament in Tokyo, Mexico defeated USA, 3–2, in 10 innings to earn a spot in the 2020 Olympic Games.

The country's softball team, finished fourth with a 3–2 loss to Canada in the bronze-medal game at The Tokyo Olympics. The games were Mexico's first foray into Olympic softball.

Basketball

Men's basketball 

Basketball is the third most popular team sport in Mexico. Mexico has a few professional basketball leagues, the top professional league is the Liga Nacional de Baloncesto Profesional where the Halcones UV Xalapa are the most successful team of the league, having won the competition four times. The best teams of the LNBP advance to the FIBA Americas League. In the northwestern states is the CIBACOPA competition, with professional basketball players from Mexico and U.S. universities. This regional league have a stake in the rest months of the LNBP.

Manuel Raga is the first and only Mexican inducted in the FIBA Hall of Fame. In 1996 Horacio Llamas made history by becoming the first Mexican to participate in an NBA game. Since then, several Mexicans followed, including Eduardo Nájera, Earl Watson, Gustavo Ayón and Jorge Gutiérrez; also, Manuel Raga and Gustavo Ayón had notable triumphs in the European Basket, as the only Mexican champions in the EuroLeague.

The best results of the National team is the first place in the 2013 Americas Championship, for qualify to the 2014 Basketball World Cup, where it reached the playoffs, the team also won the bronze medal in Berlin 1936. The nation hosted the FIBA AmeriCup in 1989 and 2015.

Gimnasio Nuevo León Independiente one of the most modern multipurpose venue located in the city of Monterrey, Nuevo León, Mexico. It was inaugurated on October 7, 2013, and is home to Fuerza Regia de Monterrey.

In December 2019, commissioner Adam Silver of the National Basketball Association (NBA) announced Capitanes de Ciudad de México, a Mexican professional basketball team based in Mexico City, were joining the NBA G League. The Capitanes join the NBA G League for the 2021–22 season, initial plan was starting from the 2020–21 season, the team would play in the G League for five seasons and be the first team outside the United States and Canada. Juan Toscano-Anderson became the 2nd Mexican American basketball player to win an NBA title when he won an NBA championship with the Warriors in 2022. Juan had played for the Fuerza Regia de Monterrey and the Soles de Mexicali.

Women's basketball 
Mexico has two main leagues to support women's basketball

 LNBPF (Liga Nacional de Baloncesto Profesional Femenil): Founded in April 2022 out of the men's organisation the LNBP. In its inaugural season it had eight teams spread across two zones:

 LMBPF (Liga Mexicana de Baloncesto Profesional Femenil) was founded in 2014 out of a dispute within the LMPB surrounding a previous attempt to set up a women's league league entitled the "Liga Nacional de Baloncesto Profesional Femenil". The league was formed with ten original teams who had been members of the 2014 version of the LNBPF: Mieleras de Guanajuato, Lobas de Aguascalientes, Mexcaltecas de Nayarit, Tapatias de Jalisco, Rieleras de Aguascalientes, Gamos de la Universidad Marista, Quetzales Sajoma, Nueceras from the State of Mexico, Leonas Cenhies and Bengalis. It operates, in 2022, with two conferences of seven teams each:

American football 

American football (gridiron) has been played in Mexico since the early 1920s, and is a strong minority sport at Mexican colleges and universities, mainly in Monterrey. American football is the fourth most popular team sport in Mexico. The maximum competition is the Liga de Fútbol Americano Profesional (LFA). The Liga de Fútbol Americano Profesional was founded in 2016 with 4 initial teams (Raptors, Eagles, Condors and Mayas), all based in Mexico City. On February 21 it held the first game and the championship game was held on April 10, leaving the Mayas as champions and the Raptors as runners-up. The LFA has since expanded to eight members as of 2019. There are plans to expand the league and increase the number of teams and the number of participating states. Funded in 2018, the Fútbol Americano de México (FAM) is considerad as a rival to the LFA given they compete for television spaces, players, coaches and in general for the same market segment. The team that became champion of the first season are the Pioneros de Querétaro (Pioneers of Querétaro).

Before this professional league was founded, the maximum competition of American football in Mexico was at the college level. American football has been played in Mexico since the early 1920s in different colleges and universities, mainly in Mexico City. In 1928 the first college championship was played, organized by Jorge Braniff. Over successive decades, more universities and colleges joined the championship, and four categories, called "Fuerzas", were created. The First Fuerza became the National League in 1970. In 1978, this was reorganized under the name "Organización Nacional Estudiantil de Fútbol Americano" (ONEFA). In 2010 a breakaway league, CONADEIP, was formed by the Monterrey Tech system, UDLAP and additional private universities.

The Aztec Bowl is an NCAA sanctioned college division post-season bowl in which American Division III college All-stars face off against a team of Mexican all-stars.

The Mexico national American football team has competed in the IFAF World Cup, which has been held every four years since 1999. Mexico participated in 1999 and 2003, finishing second in both competitions.

Raul Allegre is a former football placekicker in the National Football League (NFL); he played for the Baltimore Colts, the Indianapolis Colts, the New York Giants, and the New York Jets. Later eventually leading to his current work as color commentator for Monday Night Football with Álvaro Martín for ESPN in Latin America. He also appears on NFL32 and contributes to other ESPN programs. Isaac Alarcón  was signed by the Dallas Cowboys in 2020 as a part of the league's International Player Pathway program.

Mexico's Estadio Azteca is also notable as being the venue of the NFL-game with the all-time record attendance of 103,467 on October 2, 2005. Mexico defeated the United States in the Women's gold-medal game at the Women's tournament in Flag football at the 2022 World Games. Flag football made its international debut at the World Games 2022.

Rugby in Mexico has a long tradition dating back to the early 1900s when Europeans were migrating to Mexico. Though rugby has been a minor sport in Mexico, the Mexican Rugby Federation was established, and the sport has been steadily increasing in popularity, with around twelve teams competing in the top league. The Mexican national rugby sevens team have achieved some good results in international tournaments, including taking third place at the 2015 NACRA Sevens.

Ice hockey 

Pelota purépecha (Spanish for "Purépecha ball"), called Uárukua Ch'anakua (literally "a game with sticks") in the Purépecha language, is an Indigenous Mexican sport similar to those in the Hockey family. Although not a mainstream sport in Mexico, ice hockey is played in larger cities like Monterrey, Guadalajara, Villahermosa, Culiacán, León and Mexico City.

The Mexican Elite League is the top level of ice hockey in Mexico. The Mexican Elite League, was inaugurated on 2 October 2010 with the aim to establish Mexico as a high-level international competitor in ice hockey. Currently it has 4 professional teams and 17 associated equipment.

The "Federación Deportiva de Mexico de Hockey Sobre Hielo" (Mexico National Ice Hockey Federation) regulates all tournaments in Mexico.  The Mexican hockey league includes 7 federation clubs and 8 independent clubs. Mexico is also the only Latin American full member of the International Ice Hockey Federation and competes in international tournaments.
Claudia Téllez, at 32 became the first Mexican national to sign for the Canadian Women's Hockey League and Jorge Perez, became the first Mexican-born player at the Junior A level in Canada for Rayside-Balfour.  

Although American born and trained, National Hockey League (NHL) center Auston Matthews is of Mexican heritage through his mother, and grew up in Scottsdale, Arizona. In the 2016 NHL Entry Draft Matthews was drafted first overall by the Toronto Maple Leafs, and began his NHL career by scoring four goals against the Ottawa Senators in his NHL debut, becoming the only rookie in modern history to achieve such a feat. 

Matthews would go on to win the Calder Memorial Trophy as the best rookie during the 2016/17 season with a 40 goal campaign, helping the Maple Leafs return to the Stanley Cup Playoffs for the only the second time since 2004, where they would fall in six games to the President Trophy winning Washington Capitals. Widely considered one of the best players in the world, Matthews won his first Rocket Richard trophy in 2021 as the league's leading scorer with 41 goals in 52 games. Matthews would repeat this feat the following season, becoming the first player in a decade to score 60 goals in a single seasonand putting up a career high 106 points, for which he was awarded the Hart Memorial Trophy and Ted Lindsay Award as the most valuable player in the league as judged by the media and players union respectively.  

Guadalajara born Xavier A. Gutierrez serves as the CEO and President of the Arizona Coyotes, and is the first Latino team President & CEO in NHL history. Notable former NHL players of Mexican descent include former Montreal Canadiens forward Scott Gomez and retired San Jose Sharks winger Raffi Torres.

In 2017 the Mexican women's ice hockey team won a gold in Iceland, in their six-team division of the women's world championship. It was the first gold-medal win for Mexico at a full International Ice Hockey Federation (IIHF) world championship event. The team formed in 2012. The team's win this past week in Akureyri, Iceland, which left it in 27th place in the women's championships, earned it a promotion from Group B to Group A in Division II for next year.

Polo 

Polo was first popularized by the Escandon-Barron family in the late nineteenth century. Three members of the Escandon-Barron family would win a bronze medal at the 1900 Olympics. The Mexican polo team also won an Olympic bronze medal in 1936, the last Olympic Games which featured polo.

Mexico hosted the World Polo Championship in 2008. The World Polo Championship has been held every three years by the Federation of International Polo since 1987. Mexico's best finishes have been second place in 1987, and third place in 1995 and 2008.

The best Mexican polo player is Carlos Gracida, who is also considered to be one of the best polo players in the sport. He has accumulated more tournament wins than any other athlete in the history of the sport, winning the Abierto Argentino de Palermo tournament five times, the British Open Gold Cup ten times, and the US Open nine times. Carlos' brother, Memo Gracida, is a polo player of international renown as well and a member of the Polo Hall of Fame. The two have teamed together to win numerous tournaments worldwide.

Basque pelota 
Basque pelota is the name for a variety of court sports played with a ball using one's hand, a racket, a wooden bat, or a basket propulsor, against a wall. Since 1952, the International Federation of Basque Pelota has organized the World Championships of Basque pelota every four years. Mexico hosted the world championships in 1982, 1998 and 2006. Mexico gave its best performance at the 2006 games when they led all nations with six gold medals.

Frontenis is a variation of the Basque pelota game, itself a derivation of real tennis. It was created in 1916 in Mexico, when the idea of merging tennis and the traditional Basque pilota emerged. It is played in one of the largest courts in racquet sports with a tennis racquet that contains an optional custom double string called "doble encordado" and a tiny frontenis ball.

Racquetball 

Racquetball is a popular sport that is played in Mexico. The Racquetball World Championships were first held in 1981 and have been played every two years since 1984. San Luis Potosí hosted the championships in 1994 and 2000. Álvaro Beltrán was World Champion in 2000, and Mexican men have won the doubles titles four times: in 2000 (Luis Bustillos & Javier Moreno), 2002 (Polo Gutierrez & Gilberto Mejia), 2006 (Moreno & Beltran), and in 2012 (Moreno & Beltran). while the Mexican teams have finished among the top three in men's and top four in women's since 1986.

Paola Longoria was the #1 player on the Women's Professional Racquetball Organization tour at the end of its 2008–2009 season, becoming the first woman not from Canada or the US to do so. She also won gold at the 2009 and 2013 World Games, and again is the first non-American woman to do so. Additionally, in 2012, she became the first player to win both the singles and doubles Racquetball World Championship.

Racquetball will be included in the 2011 Pan American Games in Guadalajara.

Beach volleyball 
Mexico featured national teams in beach volleyball that competed at the 2018–2020 NORCECA Beach Volleyball Continental Cup in both the women's and the men's sections.

Individual sports

Boxing 

Mexican sport is also known for its boxing tradition. Boxing is the most popular individual sport in Mexico. Mexico is also the second in total number of world champions produced, after the United States, and has recently produced more World Champions in the last 30 years. The first boxing champion Mexico produced was Battling Shaw when he became the Light Welterweight Champion by outpointing Johnny Jadick in 1933. Thirteen Olympic boxing medals have been won by Mexico.

International Boxing Hall of Fame members include Julio César Chávez, Sr., Salvador Sánchez, Ricardo Lopez, José Nápoles, Rubén Olivares, Baby Arizmendi, Pipino Cuevas, Chiquita González, Sugar Ramos, Daniel Zaragoza, Miguel Canto, Vicente Saldivar, Carlos Palomino, and Carlos Zárate.  Other prominent Mexican boxers include World Boxing Hall of Fame members, Kid Azteca, Jesús Pimentel, Lupe Pintor, Juan Zurita, Jorge Paez and José Luis Ramírez. More recent champions include Canelo Álvarez, Julio César Chávez Jr., Marco Antonio Barrera, Érik Morales, Juan Manuel Márquez, Rafael Márquez, Israel Vázquez and Juan Francisco Estrada.

Mexico's biggest rival in the sport of boxing is Puerto Rico. There have been many classic match ups between the two such as Salvador Sánchez–Wilfredo Gómez, Gómez–Carlos Zárate Serna and many more. Other great match ups are between two Mexican fighters and Mexican vs. Mexican-American. Good examples of fighting between two Mexicans are the Barrera vs. Morales trilogy and the Márquez-Vázquez rivalry. A good example of a Mexican vs a Mexican-American are Julio César Chávez vs. Oscar De La Hoya, Bobby Chacon vs. Rafael Limón, Chiquita González vs Carbajal, (particularly so Michael Carbajal vs. Humberto González I) Márquez vs Díaz, and Corrales versus Castillo.

Taekwondo 

Taekwondo was introduced to Mexico in 1969 by Korean Mexican Dai Won Moon. With over 1.5 million taekwondo practitioners and 3,500 schools throughout the country, taekwondo is one of the most popular sports in the nation. Mexico has also been competitive on the international level in the sport of taekwondo. Over forty Mexican taekwondo practitioners have medaled at the World Taekwondo Championships.

Taekwondo made its official debut at the 2000 Summer Olympics and Mexican athletes have medaled in the sport in every Olympics since then. Mexican athletes won a bronze medal in taekwondo at the 2000 Summer Olympics, a silver and bronze medal at the 2004 Summer Olympics, two gold medals at the 2008 Summer Olympics, a bronze medal at the 2012 Summer Olympics and a silver medal at the 2016 Summer Olympics. María Espinoza has medaled at the 2008, 2012 and 2016 Olympics. Mexico currently ranks fourth on the total medal count for taekwondo, its best performance for any Olympic sport. Jackie Galloway was an alternate for the Mexican team at the 2012 Olympics.

Mixed Martial Arts
Mixed martial arts has achieved popularity in the early 21st century. Many companies promote MMA cards, with the U.S.-based UFC the most dominant. Brandon Moreno, from Tijuana, made history when he became the first Mexico-born champion in UFC history. Jessica Aguilar, a  native of Veracruz, was the first Mexican-born champion in a major MMA promotion, winning the WSOF Strawweight title in 2014 (pre-dating the UFC in that division). There have been many Champions in MMA who born in the U.S. but are of Mexican heritage, however, including some of the pioneers of the sport such as Frank "Shamrock" Juarez (UFC), Tito Ortiz (UFC), Gilbert Melendez (Strikeforce), Miguel Angel Torres (WEC), Zoila Frausto Gurgel (Bellator).

Tennis 

The Abierto Mexicano Telcel is a tennis tournament held in Acapulco, Mexico. It is an event on both the ATP Tour (International Series Gold event) and the WTA Tour (Tier III).

Rafael Osuna is the best tennis player to come out of Mexico. He was ranked number one in 1963 when he won the U.S. Open Championship. Osuna led Mexico to the 1962 Davis Cup, becoming the first team from Latin America to compete for the trophy. Osuna would go on to win a Grandslam singles championship in 1963. He also won the U.S. Open Doubles Championship in 1962, the Wimbledon double's championship in 1960 and 1963, and a doubles tennis Olympic gold medal in 1968. Osuna was killed in a plane crash in 1969 at the age of 30. 
In 1969, the Intercollegiate Tennis College Association NCAA instituted "The Rafael Osuna Sportsmanship Award" in his honor. Later that year, the Chapultepec Club, renamed its stadium "Rafael Osuna Stadium". He was inducted into the International Tennis Hall of Fame in 1979.

Raúl Ramírez was the first player to finish first in both singles and doubles Grand Prix point standings, accomplishing the feat in 1976. Raúl Zurutuza is the director of Mextenis, which organizes Mexico's Acapulco and Los Cabos tennis tourneys. Plaza de Toros México become a tennis court and hosted, as Roger Federer faced Germany's Alexander Zverev on November 23, 2019. A record tennis crowd of more than 42,000 watched, the attendance figure smashed an almost decade-old record of 35,681, set in 2010.

Auto racing 

The most notable Mexican professional auto racers have been Pedro Rodríguez, who was the winner of the 1968 24 Hours of Le Mans, and his brother Ricardo Rodríguez, who at age 18 finished second at the 1960 24 Hours of Le Mans, becoming the youngest ever to stand on the podium. He was also the youngest F1 driver at that time. They were both considered among the top drivers before their untimely deaths.

The Mexico City racetrack Autódromo Hermanos Rodríguez ("Rodríguez Brothers Racetrack") was named in their honor. Autódromo Hermanos Rodríguez has hosted several racing events including the Formula 1 (1962–1970, 1986–1992, 2015–present), Champ Car World Series (1980–1981 and 2002–2007), World Sportscar Championship, Grand-Am, Trans-Am, IMSA, A1 Grand Prix, NASCAR Nationwide Series, Formula BMW World Finals, Champ Car Atlantic Series, Panam GP Series and NASCAR Mexico Corona Series.

More recently Sergio Pérez and Esteban Gutiérrez have re-established a Mexican presence in F1. Before them, Héctor Rebaque competed in the F1 between 1977 and 1981, their best position was tenth in the 1981 season, and Jo Ramírez worked for a number of F1 teams, most notably as team co-ordinator for McLaren in the 1980s and 1990s.

The A1 Team Mexico is the Mexican team of A1 Grand Prix, the World Cup of Motorsport; Salvador Durán has earned two victories for the team.

Adrián Fernández has become a popular driver in Mexico since the 1990s and reached his climax when he finished in second place during the 2000 CART season. Fernández co-founded the Fernández Racing with which he championed the American Le Mans Series and previously won in Champ Car, the IRL IndyCar Series, and Grand-Am. Memo Rojas and Luis Díaz have also been successful in formula racing and sports car racing.

Carlos Contreras was the first Mexican-born driver racing full-time in any NASCAR national series. Daniel Suárez won the 2016 NASCAR Xfinity Series championship. Daniel Suarez becomes first Mexican-Born driver to win in NASCAR Cup Series. 
 
Since 2004, Rally Mexico is a round of the FIA World Rally Championship, held in the state of Guanajuato, and over time it has become one of the most popular rounds of the championship.

Other auto racing events currently held in Mexico include the Baja 1000, the World's most important off-road race, taking place on Mexico's Baja California Peninsula and with the Mexicans normally winning various categories. Racing events formerly held in Mexico include the Tecate/Telmex Grand Prix of Monterrey and the Carrera Panamericana, which is now held as one of the premiere vintage racing events of the World.

Golf 

Golf is a popular sport in Mexico. There are over 150 golf courses in the country. Lorena Ochoa, who was the number-one-ranked female golf player in the world before abruptly retiring in 2010, has helped increase the popularity of golf in the country. On 10 November 2018, Gaby López won her first LPGA Tour event at the Blue Bay LPGA and was the flag bearer for Mexico at the opening 2020 Summer Olympics.

In the early days of Mexican golf, there were not many Mexicans playing golf at these Mexican golf clubs. The introduction of golf came from Anglo-American business owners. These individuals used their power, influence, and money to develop the land. This in turn made it possible for these clubs to be erected, such an extravagant oasis in the middle of these cities. For example, the Monterey Club had connections in North American smelting, refining and mining companies. Furthermore, the Oro golf Club in contrast was controlled by London-based executives who held positions in El Oro Mining and Railways. The explosion of capitalist society as well as the extreme wealth being accrued by many around the world paved the way for enormous changes in infrastructure. In the early days of golf in Mexico, the MGA was composed of immigrants only. This means that the Metropolitan Golf Association of Mexico had no individuals of Mexican descent. Additionally, the modernity of golf was evidence of the vast possibilities that can be achieved by hard work. These new construction projects were palpable evidence that humans can sculpt the world around them into something new adding lakes, forests, and lush hills in the middle of an area that previously had a completely different complexion previous to this renovation. The Mexican Golf Association was originally started by Anglo-Americans although it is the Mexican Golf Association. In Mexico, they still refer to it in English rather than in Spanish which reflects the members who belonged. These men were all interested in the inherent battle with nature, risk-taking, calculation, and resilience in the face of defeat. These characteristics were all seen as applicable to these individuals' daily lives.

Professional golf tournaments held in Mexico includes, the Corona Championship, MasterCard Classic, Lorena Ochoa Invitational, Mayakoba Golf Classic at Riviera Maya-Cancún, and the Mexican Open.

Jockey 
Victor Espinoza won the Triple Crown of thoroughbred racing in 2015 on American Pharoah. He began riding in his native Mexico and went on to compete at racetracks in California. The first Hispanic jockey to win the award. Other well known jockeys include Jose L. Espinoza and Mario Gutierrez.

Fencing
Pilar Roldán was the first Mexican woman to win an Olympic medal (a silver in the 1968 Olympic games in Mexico City) and was also part of the first father-daughter team (her father was the tennis player Ángel Roldán) in the Pan-American games in 1955.

Track and field 

The 400-meter event became popular when Ana Guevara became world champion in 2003. Raúl González set the world record in the 50-kilometres racewalk twice in 1978 (3:45:52 and 3:41:20). As of October 2011, it still was the North American record.

María Lorena Ramírez Hernández, a Mexican long-distance and ultra-fund runner, became known worldwide after having won the UltraTrail Cerro Rojo in 2017 ultra-distance race of 50 kilometers, in a time of 07:20:00 and for having also done it with huaraches and her long skirt, without footwear or sports equipment. Her story  became a breathtaking short documentary in the film Lorena, Light-Footed Woman for Netflix.

Climbing
Elsa Ávila was the first Latin American woman to reach the Mount Everest summit in 1999, but she has also been the first to accomplish several other climbs. She specializes in big wall climbs and was the first Latin American woman to climb El Capitán in Yosemite, the Rockies, the Alps, the Andes, the Himalayas, Patagonia and Baffin Island in the Arctic Circle.

Skiing
Rodolfo Dickson was the first Mexican alpine skier representing Mexico to win an international ski race, winning in Super-G in January 2015.

Sports leagues in Mexico

Major sports leagues

The following table shows the professional sports leagues in Mexico and that have a national TV contract that pays rights fees.

Association Football and Baseball teams by City/Metro Area
Association Football and Baseball are the two most popular team sports in Mexico.  Liga MX is the most important and highest level league (Football). Mexico has two Baseball leagues (winter and summer) which, historically, have been comparable to Triple-A in the U.S.; Liga Mexicana del Pacífico (winter) and Liga Mexicana de Beisbol (summer).  Liga de Expansión MX (formerly Ascenso MX) is Mexico's second division in Football. The following table shows the teams of these leagues and the cites/metro areas they're based in.

Key to colors and symbols

Other team sports leagues

 Circuito de Baloncesto del Pacífico (CIBAPAC)
 Liga del Norte de Coahuila (LNC)
 Liga de Balompié Mexicano (LBM)
 Liga de Básquetbol Estatal de Chihuahua (LBE)
 Liga Invernal de Béisbol Nayarita (LIBN)
 Liga Estatal de Béisbol de Chihuahua (LEB)
 Liga Invernal Mexicana (LIM)
 Liga Invernal Veracruzana (LIV)
 Liga Mayor de Béisbol de La Laguna (LMBL)
 Liga Meridana de Invierno (LMI)
 Liga Mexicana de Baloncesto Profesional Femenil (LMBPF)
 Liga Mexicana de Voleibol Femenil (LMVF)
 Liga Mexicana de Voleibol Varonil (LMVV)
 Liga Mexicana Elite de Hockey (LMEH)
 Liga Nacional de Baloncesto Profesional Femenil (LNBPF)
 Liga Norte de Coahuila (LNC)
 Liga Norte de México (LNM)
 Liga Norte de Sonora (LNS)
 Liga Peninsular de Béisbol (LPB)
 Liga Premier de México
 Liga TDP
 Major Arena Soccer League (MASL)
 Major Arena Soccer League 2 (M2, MASL2)
 Mexican major rugby league
 Mexican Roller Hockey National League
 NBA G League (G League)
 National Student Organization of American Football (ONEFA)
 National Student Sports Commission of Private Institutions (CONADEIP)
 Veracruz State League (LVEB)

Other individual sports leagues

 NASCAR PEAK Mexico Series

International sporting events hosted by Mexico 

1968 Summer Olympics
1926 Central American and Caribbean Games
1954 Central American and Caribbean Games
1990 Central American and Caribbean Games
2014 Central American and Caribbean Games
1955 Pan American Games
1975 Pan American Games
2011 Pan American Games
1969 World Judo Championships
1970 FIFA World Cup
1986 FIFA World Cup
1983 FIFA World Youth Championship
2011 FIFA U-17 World Cup
1999 FIFA Confederations Cup
2012 FIFRA Club Championship
1974 FIVB Men's Volleyball World Championship
1974 FIVB Women's Volleyball World Championship
1979 Summer Universiade
1993 CONCACAF Gold Cup
2003 CONCACAF Gold Cup
2007–2008 FIBA Americas League
2008–2009 FIBA Americas League
2007 World Chess Championship
2008 World Polo Championship
2009 World Baseball Classic (Pool B)
2013 World Taekwondo Championships
2014 World Cup Taekwondo Team Championships
2015 World Cup Taekwondo Team Championships
2026 FIFA World Cup with Canada and United States

Italic text indicates upcoming events hosted by Mexico.

Sports entertainment

Lucha libre (wrestling) 

Mexican professional wrestling, which is known as lucha libre, has been a popular spectacle in Mexico since 1933, when promoter Salvador Lutteroth Gonzales founded Empresa Mexicana de Lucha Libre. Like other forms of professional wrestling, it is not strictly a sport, but rather a form of sports entertainment, as matches usually have predetermined outcomes. Lucha libre is characterized by rapid sequences of holds and moves, as well as spectacular high-flying moves, many of which have been adopted in the United States. The two most popular lucha libre promotions are Consejo Mundial de Lucha Libre (CMLL), and Lucha Libre AAA World Wide (AAA). Notable wrestling stars include El Santo, Blue Demon, and Mil Máscaras. The original "Big Three" of the lucha libre tradition in Mexico, other legendary wrestlers are Perro Aguayo, Rayo de Jalisco, and Huracán Ramírez.

In 2019, Alberto Del Rio and fellow professional wrestler Chavo Guerrero Jr. created their own promotion, Nación Lucha Libre. The promotion aired its first show on a television channel.

Recently, Mexican wrestlers had more participation in foreign wrestling companies like WWE, AEW, ROH, NWA, IMPACT and NJPW; these wrestlers are Blue Demon Jr, Alberto Del Rio, Rush, Bandido, Penta 0M, Rey Fenix, Thunder Rosa, Laredo Kid, Dragon Lee, Flamita, Gran Metalik, Andrade El Idolo, Humberto Carrillo, Angel Garza, Santos Escobar, etc.

See also

 Football in Mexico
 Baseball in Mexico
 List of Mexican boxing world champions
 1968 Summer Olympics
 Liga MX
 Liga de Expansión MX
 Ascenso MX
 Mexican Pacific League
 Mexican League
 Mexico–Puerto Rico boxing rivalry
 Mexico–United States soccer rivalry
 Prince Hubertus of Hohenlohe-Langenburg
 Gilberto Hernández Guerrero
 Manuel León Hoyos
 Siquitibum
 Sports marketing in Mexico
 List of Mexican records in swimming

References

Further reading
Arbena, Joseph L., ed. Sport and Society in Latin America: Diffusionism, Dependency, and the Rise of Mass Culture. New York: Greenwood Press 1988. 
Klein, Alan M. "Baseball Wars: The Mexican Baseball League and Nationalism in 1946." Studies in Latin American Popular Culture 14 (1994)

External links 
 Complete list of Mexico sports federations
 Federación Mexicana de Raquetbol – Women's Mexican Racquetball Federation